Lamprosema hoenei is a moth in the family Crambidae. It was described by Aristide Caradja in 1932. It is found in China.

References

Moths described in 1932
Lamprosema
Moths of Asia